Dysgonia pudica is a moth of the family Noctuidae first described by Heinrich Benno Möschler in 1888. It is mainly found in Ghana and Ivory Coast.

References

Dysgonia
Moths of Africa
Lepidoptera of West Africa